Imagine Me Gone is a 2016 novel by American author and novelist Adam Haslett. It concerns a couple, Margaret and John, who marry despite John's crippling depression, and is narrated by the couple and their three children. The novel was short-listed for the National Book Award and the 2017 Pulitzer Prize for Fiction.

Reception
The novel received positive reviews. Critics particularly focused on the quality of Haslett's prose. Lara Feigel, writing for The Guardian called his writing "finely adapted for each of the characters". NPR's Heller McAlpin noted how, "Haslett's signature achievement in Imagine Me Gone is to temper the harrowing with the humorous while keeping a steady bead on the pathos."

References

2016 American novels
English-language novels
Books about depression
Little, Brown and Company books